The 1996 Meta Styrian Open was a tennis tournament played on outdoor clay courts at the Sportpark Piberstein in Maria Lankowitz in Austria that was part of Tier IV of the 1996 WTA Tour. It was the 24th edition of the tournament was held from 5 August until 11 August 1996. First-seeded Barbara Paulus won the singles title.

Finals

Singles

 Barbara Paulus defeated  Sandra Cecchini (Cecchini retired)
 It was Paulus' only title of the year and the 6th of her career.

Doubles

 Janette Husárová /  Natalia Medvedeva defeated  Lenka Cenková /  Katerina Kroupova 6–4, 7–5
 It was Husárová's 2nd title of the year and the 2nd of her career. It was Medvedeva's 1st title of the year and the 15th of her career.

References

External links
 ITF tournament edition details
 Tournament draws

Meta Styrian Open
WTA Austrian Open
WTA